Jacob E. Salomon (1871–1922) was an American lawyer and politician.

A Chicago native born in 1871, Salomon studied at a grammar school in the city, then moved to New York City and found work as a merchant. He earned a bachelor's degree from St. Francis Xavier College in Manhattan and graduated from the New York University School of Law. Salomon served as an editor for The American Negligence Cases before founding his own legal practice. He was a member of the 128th and 129th New York State Legislature, representing Harlem, a part of the 33rd district, as a Democrat, winning elections against Robert D. Ireland in 1904 and George W. Corwin in 1905. Salomon maintained his legal practice until his death on July 28, 1922. He suffered a seizure while at work, and was sent to the Broad Street Hospital, where he died of heart disease.

References

1871 births
1922 deaths
Politicians from Manhattan
People from Harlem
New York University School of Law alumni
Xavier High School (New York City) alumni
20th-century American politicians
Lawyers from New York City
Lawyers from Chicago
19th-century American lawyers
20th-century American lawyers
New York (state) Democrats